Sodan is a former settlement in Inyo County, California. It was located on the Southern Pacific Railroad about halfway between Narka and Little Lake.

References

Former settlements in Inyo County, California
Populated places in the Mojave Desert
Former populated places in California